Auckley is a village and civil parish in the City of Doncaster in South Yorkshire, England, about five miles east of Doncaster city centre.  According to the 2001 census the parish had a population of 3,266, increasing to 3,745 at the 2011 Census.  The parish includes the villages of Auckley and Hayfield Green.

History
The village was recorded in the Domesday Book of 1086.

In 1870–72, John Marius Wilson's Imperial Gazetteer of England and Wales described Auckley as:

Auckley, or Awkley, a township in the parish of Finningley, and partly in Notts, partly in W. R. Yorkshire; 3 miles E by N of Rossington r. station, and 5 ESE of Doncaster. Acres, 1,970. Pop., 309. Houses, 69.

In the 1960s substantial housing development took place in Auckley to accommodate the families at RAF Finningley. This began with the Spey Drive Estate.

Since the closure of RAF Finningley in 1996 and its subsequent development as Robin Hood Airport, there has been development of the old airfield estate around Hayfield Lane. The old RAF housing has been purchased by South Yorkshire Housing Association and private individuals. New homes, businesses, schools and a hotel have been built around the airport.

Facilities
The village has a GP surgery, a pharmacy, a local shop, schools, public houses, hot food takeaways and a church.

Education
Auckley also has two mainstream schools providing education for local children from the surrounding catchment areas. Auckley Junior and Infant School for the under 11's and The Hayfield School for those over 11.

The Hayfield School ranks consistently as one of the best schools in the region. It was the 2nd highest achieving school for 2006/2007 in the entire Doncaster district (for GCSE results).

Transport

Auckley has bus services to Doncaster, Finningley, Haxey and Epworth. The nearest railway station is Doncaster.

Sport

Auckley has two large fishing lakes, called Hayfield Lakes. These lakes were used to hold the Fish'O'Mania contest, which is always live on Sky Sports once a year. In 2006 the event was held on 21 July and it lasted 6 hours. In 2006, prize money for the winner reached £68,000, which makes the contest one of the most lucrative in the fishing calendar. The last Fish'O'Mania contest held at the Hayfield Lakes was in 2007. Since then the competition has been moved to the Cudmore Fisheries in Staffordshire from 2008 onwards.

Annual show
Every August there is an annual show on the playing fields called the 'Auckley Show'. It is generally centred on a large Marquee that is erected on the playing fields. Dances, discos and gardening competitions play a role in the events. The rest of the field consists of a large car-boot sale, stalls from various government branches (usually Fire service and Police) and personal stalls. The main event lasts one day (on a Saturday) with the Marquee open from the Friday through to the early hours of Sunday morning. Traditionally there is always a 'tug-of-war' match at some point in the afternoon.

See also
Listed buildings in Auckley

References

External links

 

 
Villages in Doncaster
Civil parishes in South Yorkshire